The Charruan languages are a language family once spoken in Uruguay and the Argentine province of Entre Ríos. In 2005, a semi-speaker of the Chaná language, Blas Wilfredo Omar Jaime, was found in Entre Ríos Province, Argentina.

Internal coherence
Charruan may actually consist of two or three unrelated families according to Nikulin (2019). Nikulin notes that many of the following languages share very few basic vocabulary items with each other.

 Chaná as spoken by Blas Wilfredo Omar Jaime
 Chaná of Larrañaga (1923)
 Charrúa of Vilardebó (1842)
 Güenoa from a short 18th-century catechesis quoted by Lorenzo Hervás y Panduro

Languages
Four languages are considered to definitively belong to the Charruan language family, basically Chañá (Lanték), Nbeuá, Charrúa and Guenoa.

Chaná
Lanték Yañá (proper name of Chaná language)
 Yañá Nbeuá (the wrongly named "Mbeguá", "Beguá", "Chaná-Beguá", etc.)
 Yañá Ntimpúc (the wrongly named "Timbúes", "Chaná TImbúes", "Timbó", "Chaná timbó", etc.)
Charrúa
Güenoa

A number of unattested languages are also presumed to belong to the Charruan family:

Bohane – spoken near Maldonado, or Salto, in Uruguay
Calchine – spoken in Santa Fe Province, Argentina, along the Salado River
Caracañá – spoken along the Caracañá River, Santa Fe
Chaná-Mbegua or Begua – spoken on the Paraná River between Crespo and Victoria
Colastiné – spoken in Santa Fe Province near Colastiné
Corondá – spoken in Coronda, Santa Fe Province
Guaiquiaré – spoken in Entre Ríos on the Arroyo Guaiquiraré
Mocoreta or Macurendá or Mocolete – spoken along the Mocoretá River in Entre Ríos Province
Pairindi – spoken in Entre Ríos from Corrientes to the Feliciano River
Timbu – spoken in Gaboto, Santa Fe Province
Yaro – spoken in Uruguay between the Río Negro and the San Salvador River

Genetic relations
Jorge Suárez includes Charruan with Guaicuruan in a hypothetical Waikuru-Charrúa stock. Morris Swadesh includes Charruan along with Guaicuruan, Matacoan, and Mascoyan within his Macro-Mapuche stock. Both proposals appear to be obsolete.

Vocabulary comparison
The Charruan languages are poorly attested. However, sufficient vocabulary has been gathered for the languages to be compared:

{|class="wikitable sortable"
|-
!width="75"|English
!width="75"|Charrua
!width="75"|Chaná
!width="75"|Güenoa
|-
|me
|m'
|mi-tí
|hum
|-
|you
|m'
|mutí /em/ baté
|m
|-
|we
|
|rampti/ am-ptí
|rambuí
|-
|eye
|i-hou
|ocál
|
|-
|ear
|i-mau / i-man
|timó
|
|-
|mouth
|ej
|hek / obá
|
|-
|hand
|guar
|nam
|
|-
|foot / toe
|atit
|eté
|
|-
|water
|hué
|atá
|
|-
|sun
|
|dioi
|
|-
|dog
|lohán
|agó
|
|-
|white
|
|huok
|
|-
|one
|yú
|u-gil / ngui
|yut
|-
|two
|sam
|usan / amá
|
|-
|three
|detí / datit
|detit / heít
|detit
|-
|know
|sepé
|seker
|
|-
|good / nice
|bilú
|oblí / oblé
|
|-
|brother/sister
|inchalá
|nchalá
|
|-
|friend
|huamá
|uamá
|
|-
|why? / how?
|
|retám
|retanle*
|-
|who?
|
|ua-reté
|
|-
|past (suf.)
|
|ndau / nden
|edam
|}

Lexical comparison from Nikulin (2019):

{| class="wikitable sortable"
! gloss !! Chana (Jaime) !! Charrúa !! Chana (Larranaga 1923) !! Guenoa
|-
| we ||  ||  || ampti / am-, rampti || rambui
|-
| give || ará ||  || da.jú || 
|-
| sun || dioi ||  || diói || 
|-
| go || nderé || bajiná 'to walk' || do || 
|-
| thou ||  ||  || empti em- / m- || 
|-
| one || gilí / güi || yú ~ yu || gil: ugil 'único' || yut isa 'only one'
|-
| who ||  ||  || guareptí || guárete
|-
| sand || lgorí ||  || han || 
|-
| mouth || uvá || ej || hek || 
|-
| that ||  ||  || huati / huat- || 
|-
| white || noá ||  || huóc || 
|-
| good ||  ||  || latár || 
|-
| hear || timotéc ||  || montéc || 
|-
| come || nderé ||  || na || 
|-
| not || reé ||  || =mén || 
|-
| what ||  ||  || r'eca 'what', r'epti || retant 'how many?'
|-
| two || amá || sam ~ sán || san || 
|-
| know ||  ||  || seker, sekér || 
|-
| see ||  ||  || solá 'mirar' || 
|-
| mountain ||  ||  || to e || 
|-
| woman || adá ||  || ukái / kái 'female' || 
|-
| I ||  ||  || ytí / i- ~ y- || 
|-
| all || opá ||  ||  || 
|-
| sleep || utalá || ando diabun 'vamos a dormir' ||  || 
|-
| foot || vedé verá || atit ||  || 
|-
| kill || ña || aú ||  || 
|-
| go || nderé || bajiná 'to walk' || do || 
|-
| stand || reé utalá || basquadé 'levantarse' ||  || 
|-
| mouth || uvá || ej || hek || 
|-
| hand || nam || guar ||  || 
|-
| moon || aratá || guidai ||  || 
|-
| water || atá || hué ||  || 
|-
| nose || utí || ibar ||  || 
|-
| eye || ocál || ijou ||  || 
|-
| ear || timó || imau ||  || 
|-
| head || ta ~ ta ug vedé || is ||  || 
|-
| hair || moni || itaj ||  || 
|-
| fire || yogüín || it ||  || 
|-
| dog || agó || samayoí ||  || 
|-
| two || amá || sam ~ sán || san || 
|-
| one || gilí / güi || yú ~ yu || gil: ugil 'único' || yut isa 'only one'
|-
| person ||  ||  ||  || ëewuit edam
|-
| who ||  ||  || guareptí || guárete
|-
| die || ña ||  ||  || hallen
|-
| name ||  ||  ||  || hapatam 'his name'
|-
| we ||  ||  || ampti / am-, rampti || rambui
|-
| what ||  ||  || r'eca 'what', r'epti || retant 'how many?'
|-
| one || gilí / güi || yú ~ yu || gil: ugil 'único' || yut isa 'only one'
|}

References

 
Language families
Languages of Argentina
Languages of Uruguay
Indigenous languages of the South American Cone
Extinct languages of South America
Mataco–Guaicuru languages
Chaco linguistic area